Oil supplies over a quarter of Turkey's energy. As the country produces very little oil the country's imports cost more than its exports, which is a problem for the economy.

As only 7% of oil is produced locally, Turkey is almost completely dependent on imports of oil and oil products, such as gasoline and diesel. Over half is burned in the country's road vehicles, and Turkey is the world's largest user of liquefied petroleum gas for road transport.

After the 2022 Russian invasion of Ukraine several European countries stopped buying Russian oil or gas, but Turkey's relations with Russia are such that it continues to buy both.

Demand 

During the 2010s oil demand increased considerably, mainly due to more use of diesel, and is forecast to increase slowly to 2040.  Over half of the imported oil and oil products are used for road transport, and Turkey is the world's largest user of LPG for road transport. It is hoped that the locally manufactured electric cars and other road vehicles from Turkey's automotive industry will eventually reduce the import bill. In 2021 diesel consumption (domestic and export) was over six times gasoline.

Health and environmental impact 

Fossil fuelled road vehicle exhaust pollutes large cities, for example with nitrogen dioxide. Air pollution from diesel is worse than gasoline.  the Black Sea is not an emission control area, and there is air pollution from ships in its Turkish ports.

When oil is produced in Russia a lot of methane leaks into the atmosphere. But as the international greenhouse gas inventory standard is production based this is accounted for in Russia's greenhouse gas emissions not greenhouse gas emissions by Turkey.

Sources 

There are about 600 million barrels of oil reserves, and about 3 million tons of oil is produced each year, about 7% of consumption. So almost all oil is imported: generally 25 to 30 million tons a year, mostly from Russia and Iraq.

TPAO continues to drill 100 to 200 exploratory wells each year. Most proved oil reserves and production are in Batman and Adıyaman Provinces in the southeast, and there is a little in Thrace. The largest field is Batı Raman, with extra heavy crude oil, other fields produce much lighter oil: domestic crude API gravity averages 28, and this medium weight is suitable for the Turkish market.  There are reserves of about 20 million tons (150 million barrels) near Mt Gabar in Şirnak. Shale oil may be extractable from Dadaş, but well waste fluids would need to be properly handled to minimize the environmental impact of hydraulic fracturing.

Oil exploration licenses are granted by the General Directorate of Mining and Petroleum Affairs, but this takes a long time and requires political influence. The Petroleum Market Law provides incentives for investors to explore and produce. There is some enhanced oil recovery at Batı Raman. TPAO, the state owned exploration and production company, which does most of the oil and gas exploration, increased offshore exploration in 2020.

Russian diesel is shipped from the Black Sea ports of Novorossiisk, Tuapse and Taman.

China and India buy more Russian oil than Turkey.

Transport 

In the past oil and condensate was trucked. The Kirkuk–Ceyhan oil pipeline has a capacity of 1.6 million barrels a day (mbd). Russian and Caspian oil passes through the Bosporus. In 2005 the Oil spill response law was passed, and in 2022 oil tanker insurance was made compulsory. Black Sea gas is processed at Filyos.

Oil imports from Russia increased after the invasion of Ukraine and some claim that some is being refined and diesel sold on to the EU, which has banned direct imports of oil products from Russia since 2023, but Turkey still burns Russian diesel. Oil tankers from Novorossiysk  deliver to Korfez, and Aliağa near to Turkey's 3rd biggest city İzmir. In October 2022 almost half of Russia's Black Sea crude was sent to Turkey, but it was unclear whether the EU oil price cap would affect Turkey. Most Russian diesel exports go to Turkey.

There is a port at Aliağa called Nemrut Bay.

Processing and storage 

Tüpraş is the largest oil refiner with four refineries. But the newest refinery is Star Aegean.  Sulfur content is generally high, so refineries are being upgraded to meet Mediterranean shipping sulfur limits, which may be cut from 0.5% to 0.1%, possibly in 2025. The Kirkuk–Ceyhan oil pipeline has a capacity of 1.6 million barrels a day (b/d) and the Baku–Tbilisi–Ceyhan pipeline 1 million b/d. SOCAR Star Oil Refinery is also in Aliağa and has over half the market for petroleum products.  Total capacity of the 5 refineries is over 400 million tons a year (815,000 b/d) as of 2022.  Although refineries prefer to produce diesel rather than jet fuel half of the country's diesel has to be imported. Most exports from the petroleum industry in Azerbaijan transit Turkey, as their light oil fetches a premium price on the world market.

Retail and consumption 
There is a biennial trade fair in Istanbul.

Economics 
Many analysts say that imported oil and gas is a key weakness in the economy of Turkey. Turkey buys Urals crude from Russia because it is cheaper. It is refined and refined products sold abroad.

Subsidies and taxes 

As well as drillships there are 2 seismic ships.

Tax on diesel is lower than gasoline and it has been suggested that taxes on diesel and petrol should be brought closer in line with each other to minimise imports as there is enough gasoline refining capacity. Exploration for gas in the Eastern Mediterranean is subsidised, and is a cause of geopolitical tension because of the Cyprus dispute.

In 2022 the Turkish Energy Minister said that Turkey and Algeria would create a joint oil and gas exploration company.

Geopolitics 
In 2019, the European Council objected to the Turkish drilling activities in the eastern Mediterranean.

Unlike several European countries, which stopped buying or were cut off from Russian oil or gas, after the 2022 Russian invasion of Ukraine, relations with Russia are such that Turkey continues to buy both. Thus Turkey can burn discounted Russian diesel: also it buys discounted Russian crude, refines it and sells legally (as of 2022 - in Feb 23 EU ban on direct import of products refined from Russian crude started - products of Russian crude refined in other countries are legal) as Turkish at the global price. For example Shell and Vitol are claimed to have done this with SOCAR and Tüpraş, although there is no proof that the purchased products were refined from Russian crude. Crude from different countries is often blended at refineries so as of 2023 it is not possible to tell where a barrel of diesel originally comes from - NGO Global Witness says that the EU should ban products from refineries which refine Russian crude.

It is said to sometimes be difficult for media in Turkey to report fully on energy geopolitics. President Erdoğan said in 2022 that Turkey could not join sanctions on Russia because of import dependency. TPAO hopes to explore for oil and gas in Libyan waters, and a memorandum of understanding has been agreed with Libya.

The 2 Kurdish parties PUK and KDP would have to agree for a new pipeline to take the shortest route, as it would come form wells in area controlled by the PUK and pass through area controlled by the KDP. In 2022 the IRGC struck to stop a new pipeline.  a final ruling had not yet been made by the International Court of Arbitration on a legal dispute between Iraq and Turkey. Sales from Iraq have been hit by discounted Russian crude.

Reducing fossil fuel share of energy 
Turkey intends to increase the share of renewables and nuclear power in the national energy mix. According to a May 2022 report from thinktank Ember wind and solar saved 7 billion dollars on gas imports in the preceding 12 months. It is hoped that further electrification, of sectors such as road transport, will reduce dependency on imported oil.

History 
During the 20th century the Ottoman Empire granted a concession allowing William Knox D'Arcy to explore oil fields in its territories which, after the dissolution of the Ottoman Empire, became the modern countries of Turkey and Iraq. Eventually D'Arcy and other European partners founded the Turkish Petroleum Company (TPC) in 1912, which was renamed the Iraqi Petroleum Company in later years.

In late Ottoman times permission to explore for oil in the İskenderun area was granted to the Grand Vizier Kamil Pasha and later Ahmet Necati Bey. With the fall of the Ottoman Empire oil and gas fields in Mosul vilayet (of which Kirkuk was a part) were lost, and since then the country has had to rely on imports.

In 1926 the government took over oil exploration rights. In 2001 natural gas was legally separated from oil.

The General Directorate of Mineral Research and Exploration was formed. The first imports from Russia were in 1986, and from Azerbaijan in 2007. 

Between 2000 and 2020 the share of imported energy increased from just over 50% to 70%.

In 2022 oil consumption decreased due to covid-19 travel restrictions. Also in 2022 Middle Eastern crude was displaced by discounted Russian crude with imports tripling from before the Ukraine invasion to the start of 2023.

Notes

References

Sources

External links 
National Energy Plan (in Turkish) published 2022
Energy Outlook 2022 :tr:Türkiye Sınai Kalkınma Bankası
 Energy Market Regulatory Authority
 SHURA Energy Transition Center
 Greenhouse gas from production and refining

Climate change in Turkey
Petroleum industry in Turkey